Acclimatisation is the process by which the nervous system fails to respond to a stimulus, as a result of the repeated stimulation of a transmission across a synapse. Acclimatisation is believed to occur when the synaptic knob of the presynaptic neuron runs out of vesicles containing neurotransmitters due to overuse over a short period of time.
A synapse that has undergone acclimatisation is said to be fatigued. 

Acclimatisation is said to be responsible for 'getting used to' background noises and smells.

See also
 Adaptive system
 Neural adaptation

References

Cellular neuroscience